Sabirzhan Akkalykov (born 2002) is a Kazakh amateur boxer who won gold medal at the 2021 Youth World Championships in the light welterweight division.

References

External links

Living people
2002 births
Kazakhstani male boxers
Light-welterweight boxers
Sportspeople from Karaganda
21st-century Kazakhstani people